Brian Charles William Palmer (born 1964) is a social anthropologist and scholar of religion at Uppsala University.

Biography
Born in Brooklyn, New York, Brian Palmer graduated valedictorian of his class at Stuyvesant High School, and later he received his doctorate at Harvard University in 2000 with the dissertation Wolves at the Door: Existential Solidarity in a Globalizing Sweden, was lecturer on the Modern West until 2004. He was also the university's head tutor on religion. In 2002 he was voted "best lecturer" at Harvard University.

Personal
Brian Palmer currently lives in Stockholm.

Work

Brian Palmer currently teaches at Uppsala University in Sweden, while also lecturing widely outside the university.  Previously he held the Torgny Segerstedt Guest Professorship at Gothenburg University. Some of his works were focused on Sweden such as the country's form of socialistic individualism. He maintained that in this system, the presence of certain institutions creates a level of security for citizens, which paradoxically also leads to more freedom. He also explored the incidence of social dislocation, proposing that the countryside is itself a site of historical transformation, generating social relations, and demographic changes.

Media

Selected publications

References

External links
 official home page
 TED event page with short bio and video

Social anthropologists
Academic staff of Uppsala University
Living people
1964 births
Harvard University alumni
Stuyvesant High School alumni